In Judaism, a person who is shomer Shabbat or shomer Shabbos (plural shomré Shabbat or shomrei Shabbos; , "Sabbath observer", sometimes more specifically, "Saturday Sabbath observer") is a person who observes the mitzvot (commandments) associated with Judaism's Shabbat, or Sabbath, which begins at dusk on Friday and ends after sunset on Saturday.

Under Jewish law (halakhah), the person who is shomer Shabbat is expected to conform to the prohibitions against certain forms of melacha—creative acts. The observant Jew does not cook, spend money, write, operate electrical devices, or carry out other activities prohibited on Shabbat. In addition, a variety of positive Sabbath commandments are expected to be fulfilled, such as Sabbath meals, rituals, prayers, kindness, benignity, rest and—for married couples—sexual intercourse on Friday night.

In contemporary Orthodox Judaism, the shomer Shabbat person would typically strive to follow all the rules associated with the Sabbath. Within the "liberal" movements of Judaism, the phrase may signify a person who takes seriously the observance of the "core" mitzvot.

The shomer Shabbat is an archetype mentioned in Jewish songs (e.g., Baruch El Elyon) and the intended audience for various treatises on Jewish law and practice for the Sabbath day (e.g., Shmirat Shabbat ke-Hilkhata). In 2000, the media took note that the candidate for U.S. Vice President, Senator Joseph Lieberman, is shomer Shabbat.

Origin and usage

The term shomer Shabbat is derived from the wording of one of the Ten Commandments in Deuteronomy (5:14-15), which instructs the Hebrews to "observe" the Sabbath day and sanctify it. (In Exodus, the Decalogue states that they should "remember" the Sabbath.) The exact term "shomer Shabbat" appears in the Hebrew Bible only in Isaiah 56:2,6. Shomer Shabbat is not used in the Mishnah or Talmud, it occurs a handful of times in the midrashic literature. Similarly, the term is used infrequently in medieval and early modern rabbinic literature: for example, once in Maimonides, never in the Shulchan Aruch and rarely in responsa prior to the 20th century. The term has been used frequently, though, during the last 100 years. It is also used to name shuls, such as a predecessor to Machzike Hadath in London, a Gateshead synagogue (founded in 1897), and one in Boro Park.

Over the years, shomer Shabbat readers have been offered specialized manuals on halakhah, including a popular book by Rabbi Yehoshua Neuwirth and Sefer Shomer Shabbat by David ben Aryeh Leib of Lida (ca. 1650–1696), pictured.

A shomer Shabbat may be contrasted with the person who desecrates the Shabbat (mekhallel shabbat), a status of serious deviance when done in public.

Social dimensions
In the past, it was relatively uncommon to be shomer Shabbat in the United States, even among the Orthodox. Emanuel Feldman writes that it was a "rarity" in the American Orthodoxy of the 1950s. Political scientist Charles Liebman has estimated that overall, about 4% of American Jews were shomer shabbos in the 1960s. Among other factors, Saturday had not yet been established as a day off from work, and many American Jews found that insistence on Shabbat observance would cost them their livelihood. During this period, to improve observance, Flatbush rabbis operated a shomer Shabbat council and ran a shomer Shabbat parade.

According to the National Jewish Population Survey (2000–2001), about 50% of affiliated Jews (versus 8% of unaffiliated) light Sabbath candles. The first mitzvah in shomer Shabbat homes each Friday evening, candle-lighting is performed by 85% of Orthodox, 50% of Conservative and 25% of Reform Jews (Ament 2005:31). In total, Sabbath candle-lighting is practiced by 28% of NJPS survey respondents representative of 4.3 million Jews (United Jewish Communities 2003:7).

With the increasing observance among Orthodox Jews, the status of shomer Shabbat has become more important. For example, one of the key questions asked about Orthodox Jewish day schools is whether it allows children who are not shomer Shabbat. The shomer shabbat distinction has been found to be a factor in the social integration of children and families. Sabbath observance is a major priority among Orthodox Jewish families and one scholar contends that shomer Shabbat status is the "functional equivalent" of Orthodox Jewish identity.

Various organizations have accommodated the religious observance requirements of shomer Shabbat Jews. For example, after extensive appeals on their behalf, the U.S. National High School Mock Trial Championship made adjustments for observant Jews from the Torah Academy of Bergen County who were the 2005 state champions representing New Jersey. Similarly, hospitals may allow a shomer Shabbat program for residents in medical training, in which the shomer Shabbat resident works a similar amount of hours as other residents, but not on Shabbat or major Jewish holidays. Many municipalities have cooperated with observant Jews in creating a symbolic boundary for a neighborhood (eruv), in which a shomer Shabbat is permitted to carry or move items that would otherwise be prohibited, such as a baby stroller. In sports, observant Jews may be accommodated along with Seventh-day Adventists. Alternatively, groups like Tzivos Hashem have set up alternate leagues (such as a shomer Shabbat alternative to Little League).

Business implications
Sabbath observance is also important for Jewish businesses. For example, a paper factory in Kiryat Gat was publicized in 2000 as a shomer Shabbat factory. More critically, the observance of kashrut, Jewish dietary laws, depends strongly nowadays on people who are shomer Shabbat. The mashgiach (supervisor of kashrut) must be shomer Shabbat. In addition, it may be helpful if the owner is also shomer Shabbat, although this status does not necessarily mean they may be trusted with the oversight of their own establishment (Ament 2007). Conversely, a person who is not shomer Shabbat is not trusted for kashrut supervision, according to the Orthodox Union, based on a responsum of Rabbi Moshe Feinstein (Ament 2007). However, such rules do not impinge on employees or customers who may not be shomer shabbat.

As a consumer, the shomer Shabbat helps create a market demand for a range of specialty products. These products include electric timers, the blech (to keep food warm), clocks (such as "KosherClock: The Shomer Shabbat Alarm Clock with 5 Alarms"), and a Dutch oven or crock pot for cholent. To avoid turning electricity on or off, the shomer Shabbat may utilize a Sabbath lamp that remains lit, yet may be covered to darken a room during Shabbat.

Cultural references 
In the movie The Big Lebowski, the protagonist's best friend is Walter Sobchak (played by John Goodman), a convert to Judaism who refuses to bowl on Shabbos because he is shomer Shabbat.

See also
Shabbaton

References

Bibliography

Ament, Jonathan. "American Jewish Religious Denominations," Report series on the National Jewish Population Survey (2000–2001), United Jewish Communities. February 2005.
Yehoshua Neuwirth. Shemirat Shabat ke-hilkhatah. Jerusalem: Mekhon Nishmat Aharon ve-Ya'akov, 1993. (Rabbi Neuwirth often cites his teacher, Rabbi Shlomo Zalman Auerbach.)
David ben Aryeh Leib of Lida, (ca. 1650–1696). Shomer Shabbat: bo mevoʾar kol hilkhot Shabat bi-khelal uvi-feraṭ. (Early manual for Sabbath observance). Balḳani: Yitsḥaḳ Aiziḳ Hais, 695, 1935. Originally published in 1687. (1911 edition pictured)
Luban, Yaakov. “Current Issues Facing the Local Vaad HaKashruth.” A position paper presented by Rabbi Luban, Orthodox Union (OU), New York City, May 1, 2007. Published on the OU website as "OU Recommendations for Vaad HaKashrus Supervision." 
Pimental, Abraham Cohen. Sefer Minchat Kohen. (Early manual for Sabbath observance). Amsterdam: David de Castro Tartas, 1668.
Soae, Rafael Abraham, Cohen. 2004. Practical laws of Shabbat: a detailed halachic guide for the shomer Shabbat Jew. Jerusalem: Bene Aharon. (HOLLIS Number:  009507867)
United Jewish Communities. National Jewish Population Survey 2000-2001: Strength, Challenge and Diversity in the American Jewish Population. New York: United Jewish Communities, 2003.

Shabbat
Hebrew words and phrases